Manithan is a 2016 Indian Tamil-language legal thriller film directed by I. Ahmed. The film features an ensemble cast, including Udhayanidhi Stalin, Hansika Motwani, Radha Ravi, Prakash Raj, Vivek, Aishwarya Rajesh, and Krishna Kumar. Based on Subhash Kapoor's Hindi film Jolly LLB (2013), which itself being loosely based on the 1999 Delhi hit-and-run case, the story revolves around a junior lawyer who, after a period of struggle and ridicule among colleagues, fights a case against a powerful supreme court lawyer. Unlike the original film, which was a comedy drama, Manithan was made to be more serious and dramatic. The film was released on 29 April 2016 to highly positive reviews.

Plot 
The film begins with a drunk Rahul Dewan racing in a Toyota Land Cruiser Prado against an Audi, after he is seduced by a woman in the passenger seat. He loses control and crashes into a wall on the footpath by the road. The film cuts to a court scene where Sakthivel, an LLB graduate defending a surgeon against a Public interest litigation (PIL) filed against him after the surgeon had his son operate upon a pregnant woman in his pursuit of Guinness Book of World Records. Sakthi loses the case but decides to move to the capital Chennai to try his luck. He happens to see prominent criminal lawyer Adhiseshan defending Rahul in a sessions court. Rahul is accused of causing death under the influence of alcohol. Adhiseshan convinces the judge that prosecution had no evidence to implicate Rahul and that he was being deliberately targeted by the media as he was from a rich family, resulting in Rahul's acquittal.

Adhiseshan, though, is not satisfied with the fee paid by the Dewans. Sakthi, desperate to have some money and fame, decides to pursue the case and files a PIL in the court against Rahul Dewan's acquittal. After initially reprimanding Sakthi for his mistakes in filing the PIL and taking the press reports as an evidence, Justice Dhanapal gives a date for hearing and warns Sakthi to collect some evidence before the hearing. He then runs into Vijay Nair, who claims to have witnessed the accident. Then Sakthi introduces him as a witness in the court and Dhanapal, after cross-examining him, gives a date for the next hearing. He also summons Rahul to be present in the court for the hearing.

Sakthi becomes a celebrity overnight and is admired by Moorthy, who donates a room in his restaurant to Sakthi for using it as his office. However, Sakthi's plans turn upside down when Vijay reveals to him that he is no witness, but a crony of Adhiseshan and it was part of a plan to extract more money from the Dewan clan. As part of the deal, Nair gives Sakthi his share of the money paid by the Dewans to silence Nair. Sakthi gleefully accepts the money and regrets that had he known this plan earlier, he would have demanded more money. Nair turns hostile in the court, and Sakthi accepts the statement given by Nair. Dhanapal postpones the judgement for the next hearing. Priya Dharmalingam, the cousin and fiancée of Sakthi, chides him for compromising on justice for his greed. Sakthi realises his mistake once. Moorthy slaps him for his treachery. He returns the money to Adhiseshan and challenges him to win the case.

With the help of his uncle Surya, Sakthi collects the video footage of the Land Cruiser involved in the accident and presents it to the court. Though Adhiseshan counters him that the Land Cruiser was driven by the driver of the Dewan family, Sakthi refutes his statement by submitting the necessary evidence. Dhanapal orders the Police to provide a bodyguard for Sakthi after he was seriously beaten up by alleged assistants of Adhiseshan. Sakthi and his friends try to interview a relative of one of the victims, Muthupandi, but he says that he knows nothing. Sakthi and Priya decide to leave, but as they get on the scooter, a lorry hits them, injuring Priya. At the hospital, Muthupandi tells Sakthi that a survivor of the accident stays in Vandavasi and Sakthi and one of his friends decides to leave for Vandavasi. Inspector Selvam tries to sabotage Sakthi's investigation but Sakthi is rescued by his bodyguard. Sakthi and journalist Jennifer arrive at Vandavasi, but the police, who captured Muthupandi, kidnap the survivor.

The next day, Sakthi reveals that he brought the survivor, thanks to Muthupandi intentionally showing the police the wrong man, and Sakthi prosecutes Selvam and finds that he has botched up the investigation by declaring Kamalakannan (Raja Rishi) as dead and snatching Kamalakannan's hard-earned money to stop him from killing Kannan. Kamalakannan testifies that he woke up that night to see his family lying in a pool of blood and Rahul getting out of the car, and after seeing what he has done, Rahul spotted Kamalakannan and ran him over with his car, so no there will be no witnesses. Kamalakannan survived, with his leg being broken. Dhanapal tells Rahul to come to the podium and orders Kannan to see if Rahul was the driver. Kannan confirms that Rahul was the one who drove the Land Cruiser. After a conclusion of arguments and counter-arguments between Adhiseshan and Sakthi, Dhanapal directs the Tamil Nadu Police to suspend Selvam and initiate a criminal inquiry against him and also declares Rahul as guilty of the crime and sentences him to 14 years in jail under Section 304 and under section 307 of the Indian Penal Code. While Sakthi celebrates with his team, Adhiseshan is crestfallen over suffering defeat for the first time.

Cast

 Udhayanidhi Stalin as Sakthivel (Sakthi) 
 Hansika Motwani as Priya Dharmalingam
 Prakash Raj as Adhiseshan
 Aishwarya Rajesh as Jennifer
 Vivek as Surya
 Radha Ravi as Justice Dhanapal
 Mohan Agashe as Ram Dewan
 Krishna Kumar as Vijay Nair
 Srinivasan as Dr. Kuzhandaisamy 
 Kalairani as Judge
 Yaar Kannan as Advocate Pazhani
 Swaminathan as Advocate
 Sangili Murugan as Moorthy
 Mayilsamy as Constable Guruji
 Balu Anand as Constable
 Angana Roy as Priya's sister
 Lollu Sabha Manohar as Google
 Gadam Kishan as Shakti's friend 
 Suraj as Rahul Dewan
 Cheranraj as Inspector Selvam
 Cell Murugan as Advocate
 Sakthivel as Muthupandi
 Gajaraj as Dharmalingam
 Raja Rishi as Kamalakannan
 Sainath as Adhiseshan's junior
 Aswin Rao as Vasu
 Supergood Subramani
 Lollu Sabha Anthony
 Satheesh Kumar Sundaram
 Raju as Raju
 TSR

Production
Throughout 2014, director I. Ahmed and producer-actor Udhayanidhi Stalin planned a film titled Idhayam Murali, which would also feature Hansika Motwani and Ashok Selvan. However, the team were unable to begin production and decided to postpone the venture, instead choosing to remake Subhash Kapoor's 2013 Hindi courtroom drama film, Jolly LLB. Hansika was retained as the heroine of the project with Prakash Raj and Radharavi added to the cast, and Santhosh Narayanan signed as the film's music composer. Production for the film started in August 2015, with the film remaining untitled throughout production. Vivek also joined the cast, while Aishwarya Rajesh was signed on to replace Akshara Gowda, after the makers had a change of heart about casting the actress.

The film was revealed to be reaching completion by early December 2015, before the film's set was destroyed in Saligramam following the 2015 South Indian floods. The title of the film, Manithan, was announced on 14 January 2016, coinciding with the release of the film's first poster.

Music

The film's soundtrack album and background score were composed by Santhosh Narayanan. The soundtrack album consists of five tracks. The extra song Kaichal was not officially released, however was featured in the film.

References

External links
 

2010s Tamil-language films
Indian legal films
Indian courtroom films
Tamil remakes of Hindi films
Films scored by Santhosh Narayanan
2016 films
Legal thriller films
2010s legal films
Indian satirical films
2016 thriller drama films
Films about social issues in India
Films about corruption in India
Indian thriller drama films
Fox Star Studios films